Jingtang jiaoyu literally meaning "scripture hall education", refers to a form of Islamic education developed in China or the method of teaching it, which is the practice of using Chinese characters to represent the Arabic language.

Islamic education
Jingtang jiaoyu is the form of Sunni Islamic education taught in Xi'an, Shaanxi, by Ahongs to Chinese Muslim students. The Quran and quranic texts are taught in this curriculum.

Jingtang Jiaoyu was founded during the era of Hu Dengzhou 1522-1597. There were 5 Persian books and the Qur'an was among 8 Arabic books which made up the "Thirteen Classics" (سابقة)

Arabic language
In jingtang jiaoyu Chinese characters are used to phonetically represent the Arabic language. Chinese sounds were used to pronounce Arabic, and it was widespread among Chinese Muslim students in the northwest province of Shaanxi, especially Xi'an. An example of this is salaam, being represented in Chinese characters as ). This system of Chinese characters enabled students to coarsely pronounce the Arabic language, rather than using the characters to translate the meaning.

Jingtang jiaoyuan contains elements from Classical Chinese grammar with Arabic and Persian vocabulary, along with some dialectal Chinese vocabulary, saying all of the words in Classical Chinese grammar regardless of the proper vernacular Chinese, Arabic, or Persian word order.

Jingtang jiaoyu has been severely criticized for pronouncing Arabic incorrectly, as students base their pronunciations on Chinese. Many Hui who used it said salaam aleikun instead of salaam alaikum.

The Hanafi Sunni Gedimu cling fiercely to Chinese customs and the jingtang jiaoyu method of education, using their traditional pronunciations even when learning of the standard Arabic pronunciation. Hanafi Sunni Sunnaitis (Yihewani adherents) criticize the Gedimu for practicing Islamic customs influenced by Chinese culture, including jingtang jiaoyu. Sunnaitis pride themselves on speaking "correct" Arabic, accusing the Gedimu Muslims of practicing Han and Buddhist customs and "Chinese Arabic". One Sunnaiti Imam said that the Gedimu "blindly followed the traditions of their ancestors".

Examples

See also
 Hanzi
 Islam in China
 Sini (script)
 Xiao'erjing
 Aljamiado

References

Arabic language
Chinese characters